The 1957 All-Southwest Conference football team consists of American football players chosen by various organizations for All-Southwest Conference teams for the 1957 NCAA University Division football season.  The selectors for the 1957 season included the Associated Press (AP) and the United Press (UP).  Players selected as first-team players by both the AP and UP are designated in bold.

All Southwest selections

Backs
 King Hill, Rice (AP-1; UP-1 [QB])
 John David Crow, Texas A&M (AP-1; UP-1 [HB]) (1957 Heisman Trophy winner; College Football Hall of Fame)
 Jim Shofner, TCU (AP-1; UP-1 [HB])
 Gerald Nesbitt, Arkansas (AP-1; UP-1 [FB])

Ends
 Buddy Dial, Rice (AP-1; UP-1) (College Football Hall of Fame)
 Bobby Marks, Texas A&M (AP-1; UP-1)

Tackles
 Charles Krueger, Texas A&M (AP-1; UP-1)
 Larry Whitmire, Rice (AP-1; UP-1)

Guards
 Matt Gorges, Rice (AP-1; UP-1)
 Tom Koenig, SMU (AP-1; UP-1)
 Clyde Letbetter, Baylor (AP-1)

Centers
 Jay Donathan, Arkansas (AP-1; UP-1)

Key
AP = Associated Press

UP = United Press

Bold = Consensus first-team selection of both the AP and UP

See also
1957 College Football All-America Team

References

All-Southwest Conference
All-Southwest Conference football teams